is a town located in Koyu District, Miyazaki Prefecture, Japan.

As of October 1, 2019, the town has an estimated population of 16,663 and the density of 271 persons per km². The total area is 61.53 km².

Geography

Neighbouring municipalities 

Miyazaki
Saito
Takanabe

History
Shintomi was formed by the merger of 2 villages, Tonda and Nyūta. In Shintomi, all of the windows in the schools are double-paned to block noise from a nearby military base.

Schools
There are 4 elementary schools and 3 middle schools in Shintomi.

Economy
Bell peppers, tomatoes, cymbidium, and cucumbers are cultivated in agricultural areas of Shintomi. In the mountain areas, chickens and other livestock are raised.

Transportation

Railway 

 JR Kyushu - Nippō Main Line
 Hyūga-Shintomi

Highways 

 Japan National Route 10
 Japan National Route 219

References

External links

Shintomi official website 

Towns in Miyazaki Prefecture